Boyztown is a gay red-light district in Pattaya, Thailand. It is located in Soi 3, between Soi 13/4 and South Street.

History
It was founded in the 1980s with the first gay venue in all of Pattaya. Soon it became a popular nightlife spot for many gay travelers and locals, with a range of different places, such as hotels, pubs, restaurants, cabaret show bars, and go-go bars.
While the area was frequented predominantly by gays from the 1990s until 2009. In 2010 a shift of the area took place. Many straight visitors found the central location in south Pattaya a good location for their stay in town.

Charity Work
Throughout the decades of its existence Boyztown and its business owners have been active in charity work through a foundation called "Pattaya Gay Festival" and, since 2010, "Pattaya Pride". Donations have been made for several foundations including HIV and AIDS projects.

References

Further reading

External links
 Pattaya Pride 2011

Neighbourhoods of Pattaya
Red-light districts in Thailand
Gay villages in Thailand